Handbooks for the Identification of British Insects is a series of books produced by the Royal Entomological Society (RES). The aim of the Handbooks is to provide illustrated identification keys to the insects of Britain, together with concise morphological, biological and distributional information. The series also includes several Check Lists of British Insects. All books contain line drawings, with the most recent volumes including colour photographs. In recent years, new volumes in the series have been published by Field Studies Council, and benefit from association with the AIDGAP identification guides and Synopses of the British Fauna.

Full list of titles

Vol : 1 - Small Orders

Vol : 2 - Hemiptera

Vol : 4 - Coleoptera

Vol : 5 - Coleoptera

Vol : 6 - Hymenoptera

Vol : 7 - Hymenoptera: Ichneumonoidea

Vol : 8 - Hymenoptera: Cynipoidea, Chalcidoidea & Proctotrupoidea

Vol : 9 - Diptera: Nematocera & Brachycera

Vol : 10 - Diptera: Cyclorrhapha

Vol : 11 & 12 - Checklists of British Insects

External links
 Handbooks - Royal Entomological Society  
 Out of print handbooks - Royal Entomological Society (free to download)

Entomological literature
Handbooks
Taxonomy (biology) books